Qumlaq or Kumlak or Kumlakh may refer to:
Qumlaq, Jabrayil, Azerbaijan
Qumlaq, Oghuz, Azerbaijan